Morut may refer to:
 Aknaghbyur, Armenia, formerly Morut
 Moruț (disambiguation), villages in Romania